Alison Mary Owen (born 18 February 1961) is an English film producer. Her credits as a producer include Moonlight and Valentino (1995), Elizabeth (1998), Sylvia (2003), Shaun of the Dead (2004), Proof (2005), The Other Boleyn Girl (2007), Brick Lane (2007), Chatroom (2010), Saving Mr. Banks (2013), Tulip Fever (2017).

Life
Owen was born in Portsmouth, Hampshire, into a Roman Catholic family. Her parents were Mary Kathleen (née Hitchiner), a Royal Navy dockyard worker, and Peter Ronald Owen, chief petty officer in the Royal Navy, and was the younger of two daughters. Her sister is Jill Beatrice Owen (born 1959).

Owen's first marriage (other sources simply say "relationship") started when she was a teenager in the 1970s, producing her first child, Sarah, in late December 1979, when Owen was an 18-year-old university student. She married actor Keith Allen in 1984, and they had two children together, pop singer Lily Allen and actor Alfie Allen, before divorcing in 1989. She also had a relationship with comedian Harry Enfield who was a common-law stepfather to Owen's children. She is currently married to art director Aaron Batterham, who has four children of his own.

In 2017, the National Portrait Gallery acquired an early portrait of Owen for their permanent collection by photographer David Gwinnutt.

Career
She first started working at Limelight doing music videos. Later she then produced her first movie Hear My Song and a TV series called Diary of a Teenage Health Freak. Then she worked for Working Title. She set up the low-budget film division. Her production company is Ruby Films.

Filmography
 Back to Black (2024)
 How to Build a Girl (2019)
 Tulip Fever (2017)
 Suffragette (2015)
 The Giver (2014; executive producer)
 Saving Mr. Banks (2013)
 Jane Eyre (2011)
 The Other Boleyn Girl (2008)
 Brick Lane (2007)
 Proof (2005)
 Shaun of the Dead (2004)
 Happy Now? (2001)
 Elizabeth (1998)
 Moonlight and Valentino (1995)
 The Young Americans (1993)
 Hear My Song (1991)

Awards and nominations
Wins:
 BAFTA Award for Best British Film for Elizabeth (1999)
 Primetime Emmy Award for Outstanding Television Movie for Temple Grandin (2010)

Nominations:
 Academy Award for Best Picture for Elizabeth (1999)
 BAFTA Award for Best Film for Elizabeth (1999)
 BAFTA Award for Best British Film for Saving Mr. Banks (2014)
 BAFTA TV Award for Best Best Light Entertainment (Programme or Series) for Smashie and Nicey: The End of an Era (1995)
 BAFTA TV Award for Best Drama Serial for Small Island (2010)
 Producers Guild of America Award for Best Long-Form Television for Temple Grandin (2011)
 Producers Guild of America Award for Best Theatrical Motion Picture for Saving Mr. Banks (2014)

Source

References

External links

1961 births
Living people
English film producers
British women film producers
Mass media people from Portsmouth
BAFTA winners (people)
Primetime Emmy Award winners
Lily Allen